Francis Patrick Anderson (2 May 1916 – 29 January 1971) was an  Australian rules footballer who played with North Melbourne in the Victorian Football League (VFL).

Anderson won the Balldale FC best and fairest award in 1935 and again in 1937 too.

Anderson made his VFL senior football debut for North Melbourne against Footscray on Saturday, 27 June 1942, round eight  after getting a transfer from the Camberwell Football Club. Anderson played seven games in 1942, then played one game against Collingwood in round twelve, 1944, when he was on leave from active service.

Anderson was a member of Camberwell's losing 1946 grand final team that lost to Sandringham.

Anderson was the younger brother of former St.Kilda and West Perth footballer, Jack Anderson.

Notes

External links 

1916 births
1971 deaths
Australian rules footballers from Victoria (Australia)
North Melbourne Football Club players
Camberwell Football Club players
Australian military personnel of World War II